"Goodbye" is a song written by Paul McCartney (but credited to Lennon–McCartney) and performed by Mary Hopkin. It was released on 28 March 1969, and it reached No. 2 in the UK singles chart, prevented from reaching the top position by the Beatles' single "Get Back". In the US, released 7 April 1969, the song reached No. 13 on the singles chart. In the Netherlands and Ireland the single peaked at No. 1.

Background
The song was conceived as a follow-up to the success of Hopkin's first single, produced by McCartney, titled "Those Were the Days", which was highlighted on her debut album Postcard, one of the first records issued by the newly founded Apple Records. In later years, McCartney had little recollection of creating the song, which was written in a great hurry to capitalise on Hopkin's popularity, but he did recall being told by a boat skipper from the Orkney Islands that it was the man's favourite song, which seemed appropriate to McCartney since, "if you think of it from a sailor's point of view, it's very much a leaving-the-port song."

Recording

The song was arranged by Richard Hewson, who had also orchestrated "Those Were the Days," and produced, along with its flip side, "Sparrow", by Paul McCartney on 1 March 1969 at Morgan Studios in Willesden. To better match Hopkin's voice, the key was raised from C major to E major. The recording was Apple's first official double-A-side, and the first Apple record to feature a full-fledged picture sleeve.

For the recording, Hopkin sang and performed acoustic guitar, while McCartney played bass guitar, an acoustic guitar introduction and solo, along with lap-slapping percussion and drums. Backing vocals, horns and strings, in Hewson's arrangement, were overdubbed. The session was filmed by Apple's Tony Bramwell for a promotional clip. In the footage, Hopkin can be seen miming to the song inside the studio, combined with shots of her and McCartney in the control room listening to a playback.

The flip side "Sparrow" was written by Benny Gallagher and Graham Lyle, a songwriting duo signed to Apple Publishing. The recording took place on 2 March 1969; Hopkin sang and played guitar, McCartney added maracas, a session musician played upright bass, and Hewson arranged a choir part.

Mary Hopkin met her future husband, record producer Tony Visconti, while making foreign-language versions of the song.

The song was one of only two hits to be omitted from the compilation disc The Songs Lennon and McCartney Gave Away, issued originally in 1971 and re-released in 1979.

On 28 April 2014, "Goodbye" was released digitally along with "Those Were the Days" on Mary Hopkin Music.

Reception
Billboard praised Hopkin's "fine vocal work" and McCartney's "exceptional" production.  Cash Box described it as a "melodic lilter with a tap dance track and some powerful instrumental work." Allmusic critic Richie Unterberger described "Goodbye" as a "pleasant and catchy romp, rather like a Continental European folk love ballad in tone, with a dash of music hall."

Personnel

Mary Hopkin – lead vocals, acoustic guitar, backing vocals
Paul McCartney – acoustic guitar (intro and solo), bass, drums, piano, ukulele, lap-slapping percussion, backing vocals
Richard Hewson – orchestra arrangement

Paul McCartney recording 
For many years bootleg recordings existed of McCartney's original demo of the song, recorded for Mary Hopkin. The international online magazine PopMatters published McCartney's demo along with critical commentary expressing a preference for the composer's version over Hopkin's rendition.

The original demo by McCartney was officially released on the Super Deluxe Edition of Abbey Road in September 2019.

Chart performance

Weekly singles charts

Year-end charts

References

1969 singles
Apple Records singles
Songs written by Lennon–McCartney
Song recordings produced by Paul McCartney
Mary Hopkin songs
1969 songs
Irish Singles Chart number-one singles